Rineloricaria zaina is a species of catfish in the family Loricariidae. It is native to South America, where it ranges from the confluence of the Canoas River and the Pelotas River to the Ibicuí River in the Uruguay River basin in Brazil, as well as Misiones Province in Argentina. The species reaches 13.9 cm (5.5 inches) in standard length and is believed to be a facultative air-breather.

References 

Loricariini
Fish described in 2008
Catfish of South America
Freshwater fish of Brazil
Freshwater fish of Argentina